Village Food Stores (known as simply Village on signs) was a chain of supermarkets operating in New Brunswick, Canada, between 1987 and 1995. The chain was formed by wholesaler The Food Group Inc. (FGI) when they bought most Dominion locations in the province after they left the Atlantic Canada market.

Most Village stores were in shopping malls, and they were never more than the third-largest grocery company in the province, after Sobeys and Atlantic Wholesalers. Village was the only unionized supermarket chain in New Brunswick, and concessions to the union after a threatened strike in 1994 brought FGI to bankruptcy.

Atlantic Wholesalers bought FGI in 1994, converted most stores to the  Atlantic SuperValu format by the end of 1995, and closed the others.

See also
List of Canadian supermarkets

Defunct supermarkets of Canada